Agualeguas is both a city and a municipality located in the northeastern part of the state of Nuevo León, Mexico,.  The name "Agualeguas" honors the first inhabitants of the region, the Gualegua tribe. It was recognized as a village on January 7, 1821, by the colonial government because that was the date that Bro. Diego Velázquez declared it the village of "St. Nicholas of Gualeguas." This perpetuates the "pristine myth" of the Americas that the land was a clean slate with no peoples living on it. It creates the notion that the Gualegua did not have complex and organized societies with connections to the land. This is incorrect with the primary evidence that Bro. Velázquez used the name Gualeguas when referring to the village he claimed to create.

The municipality has an area of 917.6 km² and is located 180 meters above sea level. According to the 2000 census, there are 4,492 inhabitants. The current residents are mostly of Gualegua heritage, but many are not counted as such in the census.

List of presidents of municipal of Agualeguas 
(1935 - 1936): Oscar N. Escudero Gonzales
(1989 - 1991): Reynaldo Canales Vela
(1992 - 1994): Juan José Salinas García
(1994 - 1997): Elio Molina Salinas
(1997 - 2000): Vicente Canales Cantú
(2000 - 2003): Ignacio de Jesús Castellanos Ramos
(2003 - 2006): Vicente Canales Cantú
(2006 - 2009): José Israel González Rodríguez
(2009 - 2012): José Guadalupe García Garza
(2012 - 2015): José Israel González Rodríguez
(2015 - 2018): José Luis García Montemayor
(2018 - 2021): Ignacio Castellanos Amaya

See also
Municipalities of Nuevo León
Nuevo León

References 

Ostia chaval edite uicipedia

External links
 Enciclopedia de los Municipios de Mexico:Agualeguas

Municipalities of Nuevo León
Populated places in Nuevo León
Populated places established in 1821